The following is the current leaderboard for career strikeouts in KBO League Korean baseball.

Players with 1,200 or more strikeouts
 Stats updated as of October 12, 2022.

See also

 List of KBO career saves leaders
 List of KBO career win leaders
 List of Major League Baseball career strikeout leaders

References

Korean baseball articles
KBO career strikeout leaders